Khaled Mashal (Levantine Arabic: , born 28 May 1956) is a former leader of the Palestinian organization Hamas.

After the founding of Hamas in 1987, Mashal became the leader of the Kuwaiti branch of the organization. In 1992, he became a founding member of Hamas' politburo and its chairman. He became the recognized head of Hamas after Israel assassinated both Sheikh Ahmed Yassin and his successor Abdel Aziz al-Rantisi in the spring of 2004. Under his leadership, Hamas stunned the world by winning a majority of the seats in the Palestinian legislative election in 2006. Mashal stepped down as Hamas' politburo chairman at the end of his term limit in 2017.

The Six-Day War in 1967 forced Mashal's family to flee the West Bank and he has since then lived in other parts of the Arab world exile. For that reason, he was considered part of Hamas' "external leadership."

Early life and education 
Mashal was born in 1956 in Silwad in the Jordanian-occupied West Bank. He attended Silwad Elementary School until fifth grade. His father, Abd al-Qadir Mashal, was a farmer (fellah) and had moved to Kuwait in 1957 to work in agriculture and as an imam. He had participated in the 1936–1939 Arab revolt with the Palestinian guerilla leader Abd al-Qadir al-Husayni.

Following the 1967 Six-Day War, during which Israel occupied the West Bank, his family fled to Jordan and, after a month or two, they joined Abd al-Qadir in Kuwait, where Mashal completed high school. He entered the prestigious Abdullah al-Salim Secondary School in the early 1970s and joined the Muslim Brotherhood in 1971.

Mashal enrolled in Kuwait University in 1974, and soon become involved in student politics. He headed the Islamic Justice list (qa’imat al-haq al-islamiyya) in the General Union of Palestinian Students (GUPS) elections in 1977. The list was based on the Palestinian Islamic movement, a part of the Muslim Brotherhood. The GUPS elections were cancelled and he founded the Islamic League for Palestinian Students (al-rabita al-islamiyya li tolaab filastin). He graduated with a bachelor of science degree in physics in 1978.

As a 19-year-old, Mashal visited historical Palestine in 1975 for two months for the first time since the occupation began in 1967. He was able to travel extensively in both Israel and the occupied territories. The trip deepened his feelings for his homeland and his sense of the losses in 1948 and 1967.

Involvement in Hamas 

After graduating, Mashal became a teacher and taught physics in Kuwait until 1984. In 1983, the Palestinian Islamic movement convened an internal, closed conference in an Arab state, which included delegates from the West Bank, Gaza Strip and Palestinian refugees from Arab states. The conference laid the foundation stone for the creation of Hamas. Mashal was part of the project's leadership. After 1984, he devoted himself to the project on a full-time basis. When Iraq invaded Kuwait in August 1990, he and the rest of Hamas' leadership in Kuwait relocated to Jordan.

Mashal was a founding member of Hamas' politburo, and was elected chairman in 1996, following the imprisonment of his predecessor Mousa Mohammed Abu Marzook in 1995.

Assassination attempt 
On 25 September 1997, Mossad agents acting under orders from Prime Minister Benjamin Netanyahu and his security cabinet attempted to assassinate him. The agents entered Jordan on fake Canadian passports and disguised as tourists. Two of them waited at the entrance of the Hamas offices in Jordan's capital Amman, and, as Mashal walked into his office, one of them came up from behind and held a device to Mashal's left ear that transmitted a fast-acting poison. Mashal's bodyguards were suspicious prior to the attack and were able to chase the agents down and capture them. Other agents were also found and captured. In an interview, he described the attack as "a loud noise in my ear ... like a boom, like an electric shock." Initially, he thought the agents had failed to hurt him but later in the day he developed a severe headache and began vomiting. He was rushed to a Jordanian hospital where his condition rapidly deteriorated.

Immediately after the incident, Jordan's King Hussein demanded that Netanyahu turn over the antidote for the poison, threatening to sever diplomatic relations and to try the detained Mossad agents. Netanyahu refused, and the incident quickly grew in political significance. With Israeli-Jordanian relations rapidly deteriorating, King Hussein threatened to void the historic 1994 peace between the two countries should Mashal die. U.S President Bill Clinton intervened and compelled Netanyahu to turn over the antidote.

The head of Mossad, Danny Yatom, flew to Jordan, with Netanyahu's consent, bringing an antidote to treat Mashal. The doctors at King Hussein Medical Center, where Mashal lay in a coma, observed Meshaal's symptoms to be consistent with an opioid overdose. They administered the antidote, which saved Mashaal's life.

Immediately after the Mossad agents were returned to Israel by Jordanian authorities, the spiritual leader of Hamas, Ahmed Yassin, was released from Israeli custody, despite his life sentence. More Palestinian and Jordanian prisoners were released by Israel. The governments of both Israel and Jordan denied prisoner exchange negotiations were held.

In a 2008 interview, Mashaal said of the attempt on his life: "[It] made me more positive about life. I became more courageous in the face of death. My faith became stronger that a man does not die until his time comes. That is, I will die when God decides, not when Mossad decides. It also made me more resolute in fulfilling my responsibilities."

Expulsion from Jordan 

In August 1999, Hamas "external leadership" was expelled from Jordan by King Abdullah II. The King feared that the activities of Hamas and its Jordanian allies would jeopardize peace negotiations between the Palestinian Authority and Israel, and accused Hamas of engaging in illegitimate activities within Jordan. In mid-September 1999, authorities arrested several Hamas leaders, including Mashal and Ibrahim Ghosheh on their return from a visit to Iran, and charged them with being members of an illegal organization, storing weapons, conducting military exercises, and using Jordan as a training base, charges they denied. Mashal was expelled from Jordan, and initially made Qatar his home. In 2001, he moved to Damascus, Syria.

Election victory 

Hamas won a majority of the seats in the Palestinian legislative election in 2006.

Defying pressure from the Quartet, Mashal announced on 29 January 2006 that Hamas had no plans to disarm but added that Hamas was willing to join arms with other Palestinian factions and form an army "like any independent state". Israel's Defense Minister Shaul Mofaz threatened to have Mashal assassinated.

Prisoner swap 
Mashal was involved in negotiating a prisoner exchange deal which released captured Israeli soldier Gilad Shalit in exchange for over 1,000 Palestinian prisoners in Israel. Shalit was seized inside Israel near the southern Gaza Strip border by a coalition of Palestinian paramilitary groups, including Hamas, who had crossed the border through a tunnel near the Kerem Shalom border crossing. On 10 July 2006, Mashal stated Shalit was a prisoner of war and demanded a prisoner swap for his release which Israel refused.

On 18 June 2008, Israel announced a bilateral ceasefire with Hamas which began formally on 19 June 2008. The agreement was reached after talks between the two camps were conducted with Egyptian mediators in Cairo. As part of the ceasefire, Israel agreed to resume limited commercial shipping across its border with Gaza, barring any breakdown of the tentative peace deal, and according to one Israeli security source, negotiations on the release of Shalit were expected to resume. However, on 29 July 2008, Palestinian Authority President Mahmoud Abbas voiced his strong opposition to the release of 40 Hamas members of the Palestinian parliament in exchange for Shalit. On 2 October 2009, after the swap of 20 Palestinian prisoners for a proof-of-life video, Mashal vowed to capture more soldiers in order to secure the release of more Palestinian prisoners.

In October 2011, Shalit was released and handed over to Israel in exchange for 1,027 Palestinian prisoners.

Exile from Syria 

In February 2012, as the Syrian civil war progressed, Mashal left Syria and returned to Qatar. Hamas distanced itself from the Syrian government and closed its offices in Damascus. Soon after, Mashal announced his support for the Syrian opposition, prompting Syrian state TV to issue a "withering attack" on him.

Tour of the Gaza Strip 

In December 2012, following the eight-day conflict between Israel and Hamas and the negotiated truce, Mashal visited Gaza for the first time, beginning a four-day-long visit to the territory, for the 25th anniversary of Hamas's founding.

Upon arriving at the Rafah border crossing between Egypt and Gaza, Mashal prostrated himself on the ground in prayer, and was moved to tears by his reception. Mashal called his visit his "third birth" and wished for a fourth birth: "The first was my natural birth. The second was when I recovered from the poisoning. I ask God that my fourth birth will be the day we liberate all of Palestine." He told the cheering crowds, "We politicians are in debt to the people of Gaza." Traveling through Gaza City on the first day of his tour, Mashal visited the home of Yassin, as well as the home of Ahmed Jabari, the deputy chief of Hamas's military wing, who was assassinated at the start of the Israeli offensive in the previous month.

Addressing tens of thousands of attendees of Hamas's 25th anniversary in Gaza City's Katiba Square, Mashal reiterated his movement's refusal to concede any part of historical Palestine, stating "Palestine from the river to the sea, from the north to the south, is our land and we will never give up one inch." However, he also lent support to Palestinian President Mahmoud Abbas' successful initiative for international recognition of the State of Palestine at the United Nations, adding his belief that diplomacy helped the Palestinian cause, but was needed in conjunction with "resistance." At the conclusion of his visit Mashal stressed that Palestinian reconciliation was critical, stating that "Gaza and the West Bank are two dear parts of the greater Palestinian homeland."

Retirement 
Mashal resigned as chairman of the politburo in 2017 and was succeeded by Ismail Haniyeh, a Gaza strip resident and leader of the Hamas-dominated Gaza strip government. The handover marked a transfer of power from Hamas leaders living abroad to those living in Gaza.

Views 

Mashal believes that U.S. Middle East policy is hypocritical and not about democracy. The U.S. has no problem with a dictator that supports the U.S., but a democratic leader that is against it is treated like an enemy, he argues.

Hamas 
Mashal describes Hamas as follows:

He does not believe that there is a contradiction between Hamas' and religious diversity:

He views the goal of Hamas to be to "end the Zionist occupation; to liberate the land and the holy places; to reclaim Palestinian rights; to secure the return the refugees to their nation, lands, and homes; and to reclaim Jerusalem." Mashal wants the future Palestinian state to be one that "is open to the world, far from fanaticism, and one that promotes tolerance and accepts all."

Peace with Israel 

Mashal believes that peace with Israel requires two things: that the Palestinian refugees that fled from, or were expelled by, Israeli forces in the 1948 in which Israel was established are allowed to return and that Israel withdraws from the territories it occupied in the 1967 war. The international community has called on Israel to let the refugees return, something to which Israel has said it would never agree.

In an op-ed shortly after Hamas' 2006 election victory, Mashal suggested a long-term truce:

In a 2006 meeting with Russia's foreign minister Sergey Lavrov, Mashal insisted that Israel must withdraw from the territory it occupied in the 1967 war and recognize a Palestinian right of return if it wants peace. He declared that Hamas is "for peace in the region ... after the end of the occupation."

In a meeting with former U.S. president Jimmy Carter in 2008, Mashal clarified that any agreement with Israel would have to be ratified with the Palestinian people in a referendum. Mashal later suggested a 10-year-truce (hudna) if Israel withdrew to the 1967 border. He considered this a proof of recognition: "We have offered a truce if Israel withdraws to the 1967 borders, a truce of 10 years as a proof of recognition".

In 2007, Mashal made comments which some saw as a "softened stance" towards Israel:

Yasser Arafat 

Mashal was a vocal critic of the Palestinian Authority President Yasser Arafat, often refusing to follow directives issued by the PA regarding ceasefires with Israel. Mashal was considered a key force behind this policy, along with Sheikh Ahmed Yassin. However, Mashal did attend Arafat's funeral, in Cairo on 12 November 2004.

Gaza blockade 

Mashal believes that by blockading Gaza, Israel hopes to increase the suffering of the population so that they will turn against Hamas. He rejects the Israeli claim that the blockade would be necessary for security reasons. He contends that the blockade is in violation of international law.

Reception
In 2010, the British New Statesman magazine listed Khaled Mashal at number 18 in the list of "The World's 50 Most Influential Figures 2010". After his appearance at a congress of the Turkish Justice and Development Party (AKP), the U.S. was concerned about the relations between the party and the Hamas.

Accusations of corruption

During the 2014 Gaza war, Israel accused Mashal of corruption. In an interview Israel's Prime Minister Netanyahu said: "This guy Khaled Mashal, he’s roaming around, five-star hotel suites in the Gulf states, he’s having the time of his life, while he’s deliberately putting his people as fodder for this horrible terrorist war that they’re conducting against us". A few days later, Israeli operatives hacked into television networks in Gaza and broadcast a doctored video of Mashal talking about his extravagant lifestyle. "In the name of Allah, most gracious, most compassionate," he began, "I want to start by thanking the excellent staff of the kitchen at my hotel." He went on to explain how much his hotel room cost.

Simultaneously, the Israeli press published stories about widespread corruption within the Hamas leadership, alleging that Mashal and Abu Marzook embezzled as much as $2.5 billion each. Mashal has vehemently denied the corruption accusations.

Family life
Mashal married in 1980 or 1981 and is the father of three daughters and four sons.

Mashal's half-brother is the former Al-Sakhra Band singer and former Dallas Public Works and Transportation Department engineer Mufid Abdulqader.  Abduqalder is serving a 20-year prison sentence in the United States for funding Hamas through the Holy Land Foundation for Relief and Development.

Notes and references

Notes

Citations

Sources

Books

News

Interviews

Op-eds

Other 

 
 
 
 
 
 
 
 
 
 
 
 

1956 births
Living people
Palestinian Muslims
Palestinian Sunni Muslims
Kuwait University alumni
Hamas leaders
Palestinian politicians
People from Silwad